Fricis Apšenieks (Old orthography: Fritzis Apscheneek; 7 April 1894 in Tetele, Courland Governorate – 25 April 1941 in Riga, Latvian SSR) was a Latvian chess master.

Biography

In 1924, Apšenieks finished 2nd, behind Hermanis Matisons, at Riga, and he won, ahead of Frédéric Lazard, at Paris. In 1924, he took 2nd, behind Hermanis Matisons, and followed by Edgar Colle, Arpad Vajda, Max Euwe, Anatol Tschepurnoff, finished 1st at the FIDE World Amateur Championship in Paris. In 1925, he won, ahead of F.H. Terrill, at Bromley. In 1925, he tied for 3rd-4th with Karel Hromadka at Bromley (Premier–A). In 1925, he tied for 3rd-4th at Debrecen. In 1926, he tied for 3rd-4th at Abo. In 1926, he won at Helsinki. In 1926, he took 3rd, behind Vladimirs Petrovs, and Teodors Bergs at Riga. In 1926, Apšenieks won the Latvian Championship at Riga. In 1927, he tied for 5th-7th at Kecskemét. In 1931, he took 6th at Klaipėda (won by Isakas Vistaneckis). In 1932, he tied for 3rd-5th at the Riga Championship. In 1934, he tied for 1st with Vladimirs Petrovs at Riga. In 1937, he tied for 11th-13th at Ķemeri. In 1939, he tied for 11th-12th at Kemeri–Riga (Salo Flohr won). In 1941, he took 2nd, behind Alexander Koblencs, at Riga.

Apšenieks played for Latvia at seven official Chess Olympiads: in 1928, 1930, 1931, 1933, 1935, 1937, and 1939. He also played in the unofficial Olympiad at Munich 1936. 
 In July/August 1928, he played at first board at the 2nd Chess Olympiad in The Hague (+8–7=1).
 In July 1930, he played at first board at the 3rd Chess Olympiad in Hamburg (+7–6=4).
 In July 1931, he played at second board at the 4th Chess Olympiad in Prague (+8–3=5).
 In July 1933, he played at first board at the 5th Chess Olympiad in Folkestone (+1–6=7).
 In August 1935, he played at second board at the 6th Chess Olympiad in Warsaw (+6–5=7).
 In August/September 1936, he played at second board at the unofficial Olympiad in Munich (+7–5=6).
 July/August 1937, he played at second board at the 7th Chess Olympiad in Stockholm (+8–4=5).
 In August/September 1939, he played at second board at the 8th Chess Olympiad in Buenos Aires (+5–6=8).

During the first Soviet occupation of Latvia, he died of tuberculosis at the age of 47.

Notable chess games 
 Fricis Apšenieks vs Max Euwe (NED), Paris 1924, (ol) f-A, Four Knights, C49, 1-0
 Fricis Apšenieks vs Arthur William Dake (USA), Prague 1931, 4th Olympiad, Caro-Kann, Exchange Variation, B13, 1-0
Gideon Stahlberg (SWE) vs Fricis Apšenieks, Folkestone 1933, 5th Olympiad, Queen's Gambit Declined, Slav, D11, 0-1
Frank James Marshall (USA) vs Fricis Apšenieks, Warsaw 1935, 6th Olympiad, Queen's Gambit Accepted, D20, 0-1
 Fricis Apšenieks vs Salo Landau (NED), Kemeri 1937, Slav Defense, D12, 1-0
Fricis Apšenieks vs Reuben Fine (USA), Stockholm 1937, 7th Olympiad, Four Knights, C49, 1-0

References

1894 births
1941 deaths
People from Jelgava Municipality
People from Courland Governorate
Chess Olympiad competitors
Latvian chess players
Soviet chess players
20th-century chess players
Tuberculosis deaths in Latvia
Tuberculosis deaths in the Soviet Union
20th-century deaths from tuberculosis